Podgornoye (Babırgan) is a rural locality (a selo) in Mayminskoye Rural Settlement of Mayminsky District, the Altai Republic, Russia. The population was 546 as of 2016. There are 18 streets.

Geography 
Podgornoye is located on the left bank of the Katun River, 15 km north of Mayma (the district's administrative centre) by road. Platovo is the nearest rural locality.

References 

Rural localities in Mayminsky District